Hongtudi  is an interchange  station on Line 6 and Line 10 of Chongqing Rail Transit in Chongqing Municipality, China. It is located in the Jiangbei District. The lowest level being 94 meters below ground makes it one of the world's deepest subway stations.

History
In 2012, the opening of the Line 6 platforms made the station the deepest subway station in China, at over 60 meters below the surface. In 2017, the station became even deeper with the opening of Line 10 platforms, reaching over 94 meters below the ground. The new Line 10 platforms became one of the deepest subway stations in the world after Arsenalna Station in the Kyiv Metro. (Currently the record has been broken by Hongyancun station of Line 9, reaching 116 meters below the ground)  The journey from the surface to Line 10 platforms takes over 5 minutes. The station's extreme depth, large transfer demand between the two lines and numerous entrances on the surface necessitates the need for over 91 escalators to be installed throughout the entire station.

Station structure

Floors

Line 6 Platform
Platform layout
An island platform is used for Line 6 trains travelling in both directions.

Line 10 Platform
Platform layout
An island platform is used for Line 10 trains travelling in both directions.

Exits
There are a total of 4 entrances/exits currently in use for the station. Exit 2 closed after the opening of Line 10.

Surroundings
Nearby places
Wuhong Road
Chuangxin Luse Garden residential block
Jinke Garden residential block
Tian'an Dingdu residential block
Ji'an Yuan residential block
Lidu residential block

Nearby stations
Liyuchi (a Line 10 station)

References

Jiangbei District, Chongqing
Railway stations in Chongqing
Railway stations in China opened in 2012
Chongqing Rail Transit stations